Moustapha Diarra (born June 17, 1987) is a French basketball player.  tall, Diarra plays as center. He has played for several teams in France during his career.

References

French men's basketball players
Sheridan Generals men's basketball players
San Francisco Dons men's basketball players
Sportspeople from Marseille
Living people
1987 births
Paris Basketball players
Centers (basketball)